Lower Upnor and Upper Upnor are two small villages in Medway, Kent, England. They are in the parish of Frindsbury Extra on the western bank of the River Medway. Today the two villages are mainly residential and a centre for small craft moored on the river, but Upnor Castle is a preserved monument, part of the river defences from the sixteenth century.

Origins
Upnor meant "at the bank" being "æt þæm ōre" in Old English and "atten ore" in Middle English and "atte Nore" in 1292. However, the meaning changed to "upon the bank" (Middle English: "uppan ore") and by 1374 it was "Upnore".

A skeleton of a straight-tusked elephant was excavated in 1911, during the construction of the Royal Engineers' Upnor Hard.

Lower Upnor

Lower Upnor faces the Upnor Reach of the River Medway. It was a single row of houses, separated from the river by the roadway and the hard. Located here is the Arethusa training centre, which provides residential school trips and educational visits and is run by the Shaftesbury Homes and Arethusa. In 1849, HMS Arethusa was the name of the training ship moored near the shore. The society had moored a training ship here for over 105 years. The first was Chichester, but after then all the ships were called Arethusa. The last but one Arethusa was the Peking, one of the R.F Laeisz's Flying P-Liner four-masted barques, built in 1911, and acquired after 1918 as war reparations. She was sold in 1975 to the South Street Seaport Museum in New York. The last Arethusa, a 23-metre two-masted ketch, was sold in 2000 and now sails with the Cirdan Sailing Trust under the name Faramir.

In recent times extra housing has been built behind this street, exploiting the land exposed by quarrying the steep hillside that leads to Hoo Common.

Lower Upnor is also the home of two yacht/sailing clubs. Upnor Sailing Club was formed in the 1962 and moved into its present club house (formed from renovating three existing traditional riverfront cottages) in the 1980s.

Upper Upnor
Upper Upnor comprises a village cobbled high street leading down to Upnor Castle. It has many houses displaying Kentish weatherboarding, some are Grade II listed.

It also has some terraced streets including former military housing. Upper Upnor is on the Chatham Reach of the River Medway, directly opposite St Mary's Creek.

London Stones

The London Stones are in Lower Upnor on the shoreline. They mark the limit of the charter rights of London fishermen. The older stone has the date 1204 carved on it as part of an eighteenth-century inscription.

Industry
Like other parts of Frindsbury, chalk has been extracted, high quality moulding sand has been taken from a pit near the Church, and William Burgess Little built 25 five barges at his yard between 1843 and 1871. The first was the Sarah Little and the last called W.B.Little Finish. James Little built three barges here in 1891, 1893, and 1895. A potter's kiln can be seen on an 1830 watercolour by Susan Twopeny, now in Rochester Guildhall Museum.

The church
The ecclesiastical parish of Upnor split from Frindsbury in 1884 and was reabsorbed in 1955. The parish church of St Philip and St James (1884) was designed by Ewan Christian. It is virtually unaltered.
Francis Drake's father was ordained deacon and made vicar of the Church upon the River Medway.

The military

Upnor Castle

Upnor Castle was built as an artillery fort between 1559 and 1567 in order to protect Chatham Dockyard and the associated naval anchorage. It was called into action in June 1667 when the Dutch Navy conducted a raid on the ships moored in the river; the castle proved ineffective in repelling the attack and it was decommissioned soon afterwards. Though the castle was only operational as a fort for about 100 years, it was retained as a gunpowder magazine and ammunition store until the end of the First World War; continuing in military use through World War II, it was opened to the public as a museum in 1945.

Lower Upnor ordnance depot

Upnor Castle served as a gunpowder magazine for the Board of Ordnance from 1668, providing powder for the defences of Chatham Dockyard and for the fleet based in the Nore. In 1810 a new magazine with space for 10,000 barrels of gunpowder was built downriver from the castle (which had long needed to expand its capacity) along with a 'shifting house' for inspecting powder that had arrived by sea (though demolished, its surrounding earth traverse is still in evidence, midway between the magazine and the castle).

In 1856 a second magazine was constructed alongside the first, to the same design but with more than double the capacity; (this still stands on the river bank, the earlier magazine having been demolished in 1964). At the same time, buildings were constructed (alongside the shifting house) for storing and maintaining artillery shells; but these soon proved too small, so the site began to be extended to the north, where additional shell stores were built from the 1860s onwards. A little further to the north, a group of large houses were bought to serve as offices for the depot. There was not enough space, though, for further bulk storage of gunpowder, so in 1875 a separate set of five magazines were built, inland at Chattenden, and linked to Upnor by a narrow-gauge railway (see below); the Upnor magazines were then converted into filled shell stores.

In 1891 Britain's Ordnance Yards were split between the Admiralty and the War Department, Upnor going to the former, Chattenden to the latter. The Admiralty therefore embarked on building a new inland depot, next to Chattenden, at Lodge Hill; opening in 1898, it dealt principally with cordite. At Upnor itself further Shell Stores was built in the 1880s, supplemented by new buildings for storing wet and dry guncotton (used in torpedoes and mines) in 1895. The site was extended further to the north in the early 1900s to allow construction of a much larger store for filled shells and another for mines. At the same time a complex of buildings for filling shells with powder (and later also with trotyl and amatol) were added behind the original 'A' and 'B' magazines.

The three sites, Upnor, Lodge Hill and Chattenden, were active as Royal Naval Armaments Depots until the mid-1960s. Thereafter they remained in military hands as part of the Royal School of Military Engineering until the mid-2010s.

Present day
The Lower Upnor site was put up for sale in 2014. Two years later, the Grade II* listed 'B' Magazine was being converted into offices, while a residential building of similar proportions was being erected on the footprint of the demolished 'A' Magazine alongside; behind the magazines, more apartments were planned within the surviving concrete traverses (blast walls) of a demolished set of shell-filling rooms (dating from 1906). Meanwhile, the surviving buildings to the north were also being refurbished for light commercial and retail use. The inland depots, latterly known as Chattenden and Lodge Hill Military Camps, were put up for sale in 2016.

Gallery

The military railway

The army used this area to train a railway engineering force. They built a standard gauge railway from Chattenden to Upnor in 1872–73. This was abandoned before 1881 and a  gauge line was built in 1885 or by the 8th (Railway) Company R.E. in 1898. One branch went to Lower Upnor, and the other to the camp by Tower Hill. This line was used to supply armaments from Chattenden, the Lodge Hill Ammunition Depot and the standard gauge at Sharnal Street, to the warships and the Upnor Magazine. The service closed on 19 May 1961.

In 1965–1967, the Royal Engineers converted the route from Lower Upnor to Chattenden into a road, including building a new bridge over Four Elms Hill (the main road through Chattenden village). The new road is named Upchat Road.

The Royal Engineers

The Royal Engineers still have a presence in Upper Upnor; the Royal School of Military Engineering (Riverine Operations section) maintains classrooms, workshops and a hard in Upnor for training Royal Engineers assault boat operators and watermanship safety officers, who continue to operate craft on operations all over the world. The section operates Mk 1 and 3 Rigid Raiders, and combat support boats, as well as teaching use of the Mk 6 Assault Boat. The area is also used for other training purposes by the Royal School of Military Engineering including practice and test bomb disposal tasks by the Defence Explosive Ordnance Disposal School, until its move to Bicester.

See also
 Raid on the Medway

References

External links

Frindsbury Extra Parish Council

Villages in Kent